General Sir John Bryan Akehurst,  (12 February 1930 – 20 February 2007) was a British Army officer who rose to be Deputy Supreme Allied Commander Europe.

Military career
Educated at Cranbrook School and the Royal Military Academy, Sandhurst, John Akehurst was commissioned into the Northamptonshire Regiment in 1949. He was seconded to the Malay Regiment in 1952 during the Malayan Emergency. He was appointed Commanding Officer of 2nd Battalion Royal Anglian Regiment in 1968.

In 1974 he commanded the Dhofar Brigade of the Sultan of Oman's Armed Forces against a communist-inspired armed insurrection during the Dhofar Rebellion. It reached a peak in the autumn of 1975 when he successfully launched an attack from the mountain garrison of Sarfait on the border, although at Christmas 1975 his helicopter was attacked by guerrillas.

He spent two years as Deputy Military Secretary from 1976 to 1978 and then became General Officer Commanding 4th Armoured Division in 1979. In 1982 he was appointed Commandant of the Staff College, Camberley and in 1984 he became Commander of the UK Field Army. His final appointment was as Deputy Supreme Allied Commander Europe in 1987; he retired in 1990.

Family
In 1955 he married Shirley Anne Webb. Their two children died in childhood from cystic fibrosis. Lady Akehurst died on 31 December 2020 at the age of 85.

References

Bibliography
We Won a War: The Campaign in Oman 1965–1975 by John Akehurst, Russell Publishing, 1982, 
Generally Speaking: Then Hurrah for the life of a Soldier by John Akehurst. Published by Michael Russell Publishing Ltd, 1999,  

|-

|-

|-

 

1930 births
2007 deaths
Military personnel from Kent
British Army generals
Knights Commander of the Order of the Bath
Commanders of the Order of the British Empire
Northamptonshire Regiment officers
British Army personnel of the Malayan Emergency
British military personnel of the Dhofar Rebellion
People educated at Cranbrook School, Kent
Graduates of the Royal Military Academy Sandhurst
Royal Anglian Regiment officers
NATO military personnel
Commandants of the Staff College, Camberley